Mohammad Reza Ali Nazari Hassan Dabous (born 2 September 1989) is a Pakistani international footballer, who plays in Denmark for Tårnby FF.

He played his first international match in 2012 against Singapore and scored his first international goal against Nepal in the 2018 SAFF Championship

International career

International goals
Scores and results list Pakistan's goal tally first.

References

1989 births
Living people
Danish people of Pakistani descent
Danish men's footballers
Pakistani footballers
Pakistani expatriate footballers
Pakistan international footballers
HB Køge players
Association football forwards
Boldklubben af 1893 players
Kjøbenhavns Boldklub players
Greve Fodbold players
BK Avarta players
Holbæk B&I players